Live from Atlanta is an album by the band Casting Crowns. Released in 2004, it is a two-disc set which contains a concert DVD in addition to the music CD.

Track listing
"If We Are the Body" (Casting Crowns, Mark Hall) – 4:09
"Who Am I" (Crowns, Hall) – 5:29
"Voice of Truth" (Crowns, Hall, Steven Curtis Chapman) – 4:14
"Here I Go Again" (Crowns, Hall) – 4:55
"American Dream" (Crowns, Hall) – 4:44
"Beautiful Savior" (Stuart Townend) – 5:59

Chart positions

Personnel 
Casting Crowns:

Mark Hall – vocals
Juan DeVevo – guitar, background vocals
Chris Huffman – bass guitar
Megan Garrett – vocals, accordion, keyboards
Melodee DeVevo – vocals, violin
Andy Williams – drums

References

Casting Crowns albums
2004 live albums
2004 video albums
Live video albums
Christian live video albums